Moyua is a station on lines 1 and 2 of the Bilbao metro. The station is located in the neighborhood of Abando, in the district with the same name. The station is located under the Moyua Plaza, named after Federico Moyúa, mayor of Bilbao during the early 20th century. It opened on 11 November 1995.

It is the second most used station of the network after Abando, and is the closest station in distance to the Guggenheim Museum Bilbao.

Station layout 

Moyua station follows the typical cavern-shaped layout of most underground Metro Bilbao stations designed by Norman Foster, with the main hall located directly above the rail tracks.

Access 

  3 Moyua Plaza (Elcano exit)
  1 Moyua Plaza (Ercilla-Guggenheim exit)
  8 Diputación street (Diputación exit, closed during night time services)
   37 Gran Vía (Ercilla-Guggenheim exit)

Services 
The station is served by line 1 from Etxebarri to Ibarbengoa and Plentzia, and by line 2 from Basauri to Kabiezes. The station is also served by local Bilbobus and regional Bizkaibus bus services.

Future 
In 2008 the Basque Government made public the project for line 4 of the metro, which was to connect Moyua with the southern district of Errekalde, with the construction works expected to begin within the following two years. In 2009 the Basque Government announced the possibility of connecting the then under construction line 3 with the future line 4 at Matiko, thus extending the line 4 from Errekalde to Matiko via Moyua and two additional stations, one by the Doña Casilda Iturrizar park and another one by the campus of the University of Deusto. This project would have involved constructing a second station hall at Moyua for the new platforms and tracks.

The line however stayed as a mere project, and in 2017 the Basque Government announced that any type of construction work could not begin before 2020 due to the lack of resources, a problem that also affected the line 5 project to Galdakao.

References

External links
 

Line 1 (Bilbao metro) stations
Line 2 (Bilbao metro) stations
Buildings and structures in Bilbao
Railway stations in Spain opened in 1995
1995 establishments in the Basque Country (autonomous community)